Faujdar under the Mughals was an office that combined the functions of a military commander along with judicial and land revenue functions. However, the term faujdar contained pre-Mughal origins. During those times, the term referred to a military officer but did not refer to a specific rank.  With the administrative reforms performed by Mughal emperor Akbar, this rank was systemised. It constituted an independent administrative unit and its territorial limits varied from place to place and from time to time.

A faujadari comprised a number of thanas or military outposts. At each of these the number of swears were stationed under a thanadar. Faujdari carried with it a fixed number of sawars and it was up to the faujdar to station soldiers in various thanas under him.

In addition in some faujdaris there were a number of thanas described as huzuri or huzuri mashruti. In these thanas the Thanadars were appointed directly by the central government via royal orders or at the recommendations of the Nazim or Diwan of the province. Such thanadars were to a considerable degree independent officers who could receive orders direct from the central government. They were probably placed under the overall supervision of the faijdar and were expected to cooperate with him in mainataing law and order. They were created to ensure an efficient check on ambitious faujdars.

In any case in an emergency the faujdar of a charge could be called upon to enforce imperial regulations.

They were appointed by virtue of a royal order and the appointment bore the seal of the Bakshi ul Mulki. They received orders directly from the Emperor and submitted petitions directly to the court. Transfer was a well established practice.

Duties 
Generally his military and police duties included:

 Maintaining law and order.
 Enforcing imperial regulations.
 Preventing drinking and other forbidden activities.
 Making sure blacksmiths did not manufacture guns.
 Apprehending thieves and restoring stolen properties. If he failed to do so, he was personally responsible.
 Maintaining law and order and ensuring the safety of roads and highways.
 Keeping rebel zamindars under check.
 Making sure his soldiers were well equipped and making necessary arrangements in case a soldier lost his horse for whatever reason.
His judicial functions were:
 He dispensed justice.
 Court was attended by him, Qazi and the Diwan. He presided.
 Cases regarding Holy Law were decided by him in consultation with judicial officials such as Mufti, Qazi and Mir Adl.
 Cases which fell under the purview of revenue and other general imperial regulations, were decided by him with no consultations with anyone else.
His revenue administration functions were:
 Directly associated with the collection of land revenue from zamindars who evaded payment and only paid under the threat of force.
 Could entrust the collection of land revenue from such zamindars to the Maori or nominate an intermediary and authorise the Maori to collect the land revenue from the latter.
 Indirectly associated with land revenue as he was required to render necessary assistance in collection of land revenue to the Amil in Khalsa or jagir lands on a written request from the latter. Could not pillage a village until a written request was forthcoming from the Amil.
 On receipt of such a written request he was required to get hold of a few Muqaddams and persuade them to be obideient. If they responded favourably at this stage the Faujdar was required to obtain written consent from the Amil.
 If the Muqaddams refused to submit, he was to pillage the village and chastise the rebels. The ryots should not be harmed. The booty acquired was to be handed over to the Amil who had give a receipt to the Faujdar.

See also
Kotwal
Kiladar
Castellan

References

Titles in India
Titles in Pakistan
Titles in Bangladesh